Olga Vladimirovna Baklanova (19 August 1893 – 6 September 1974), known professionally as Olga Baclanova, was a Russian-born actress who found success in Hollywood film and stage roles, mainly as an exotic blonde temptress, who was given the title of the "Russian Tigress".

Baclanova spent her early years in her native land appearing in silent films from 1914 until 1918, reducing her age by several years and changing the spelling of her native surname Baklanova. She was often billed under her surname only, similarly to the surname-only nomenclature of her fellow countrywoman Nazimova.

She emigrated to the United States in 1925, and started appearing on stage and subsequently in Hollywood films, which she remains most noted for the Universal Pictures silent  The Man Who Laughs as the evil Duchess Josiana and in Tod Browning's cult-classic horror film Freaks (1932) at MGM, as scheming circus trapeze artist, Cleopatra.

Early life, Moscow Arts Theatre and Russian career (radio, stage and film) 

Olga Vladimirovna Baklanova was born on 19 August 1893 (other sources state 1883, 1884 or even 1900, according to her obituary) in Moscow, Russia. She was the daughter of Vladimir Baklanov and his wife Alexandra, an actress in early Russian films. She had 6 siblings, including later Soviet general and World War II hero Gleb Baklanov. Baclanova studied drama at the Cherniavsky Institute before being accepted into the Moscow Art Theatre with contemporaries such as Maria Ouspenskaya in 1912.

Over the next decade she appeared in Russian films, and also performed extensively on stage, touring and performing in many countries of the world. She was a feature actress of plays by Ibsen, Chekhov and Turgenev, and the M.A.T productions of Shakespeare, Dickins and Berger.

In the 1930s, Baclanova, who had vocal training at the Moscow Arts Theatre, had a program called Olga Baclanova's Continental Review, and she often appeared as a guest on radio programs singing songs in her native Russian, often with the F. Zarkerich Orchestra and also made recordings, including an album titled the "Olga Baclanova Album", released in 1946, by Unique Records

In 1925 she was given the award "Merited Artist of the Republic", the highest Soviet artist honour. Baclanova appeared in around 17 films during her career in Russia.

American career 

Baclanova first came to New York City with the 1925 touring production of the Moscow Art Theatre's Lysistrata. Though the rest of the company returned to Russia the following year, she stayed in America. She would appear in a West Coast production of The Miracle, before being cast in a bit part in her debut film, The Dove in 1927. A statuesque blonde, Baclanova quickly established herself as a popular actress in American silent movies and achieved a notable success with The Docks of New York in 1928, directed by Josef von Sternberg. Later that year, she appeared in The Man Who Laughs as Duchess Josiana, the femme fatale love interest to Conrad Veidt's disfigured hero.

The introduction of talking films proved difficult for Baclanova, as audiences did not respond to her heavy Russian accent. She no longer secured leading roles, and was relegated to supporting parts. Her career was in decline when she was offered the role of the cruel circus performer Cleopatra in Tod Browning's film Freaks (1932). This horror movie, which featured actual carnival freaks, was highly controversial and screened only briefly before being withdrawn. It would be 30 years before Freaks gained a cult following. The movie did not revive Baclanova's film career, which ended in 1943.

Baclanova worked extensively on stage in London's West End and in New York, for about 10 years starting in the mid-1930s. In 1943 she appeared in Claudia at the Moore Theatre in Seattle, Washington.

Personal life 
Baclanova's father died of natural causes in 1922. She was married three times. Her first husband was a lawyer named Vladimir Zoppi with whom she had her first son. Her second husband was actor Nicholas Soussanin with whom she had her second son. The birth of her second son was front-page news and was covered quite extensively in the press in 1930. Her third marriage was to Russian-born David Judovitch, better known as Richard Davis (1900–1984), who owned the Fine Arts Theatre in New York. In 1931, Baclanova became a naturalized American citizen.

Legacy 

[[File:Freaks002.jpg|left|thumb|Baclanova in Freaks]]Olga's likeness to the American pop singer Madonna in the 1980s has been frequently mentioned as particularly evident in The Man Who Laughs.

In Russia, Baclanova's departure from the USSR is well remembered for its involuntary significant contribution to the unrivaled success of a Soviet movie star Lyubov Orlova, a struggling ex-pianist with a certain likeness to Olga. In 1926, Orlova was promoted from a choir, after two months in a theatre, by the heart-broken Vladimir Nemirovich-Danchenko, a rumored lover and/or admirer of Baclanova, his favorite student. Fashion historian Alexander Vasilyev remembered in 2018: "He [Vladimir] loved her [Olga] in letters, he was thinking deeply about her. The only time he cried [publicly], at the piano in the Art Theatre foyer, was when he had found out about Olga Vladimirovna Baclanova [emigration]... He really began to cry. I'm sure of this, not because I was there but because I was a friend of  who was also closely connected to Nemirovich-Danchenko and could have known this from the wife of the famous director... Lyubov Orlova blossomed as Baclanova's substitute."

 Later years 
After her retirement she migrated to Switzerland. She died at a rest home on 6 September 1974 from lung cancer in Vevey, aged 81, and apparently had Alzheimer's disease, although this is unconfirmed. She was interred at Corsier cemetery, in Corsier-sur-Vevey.

 Filmography 

 Russian films 

 United States Silent Films 

 United States Sound Films 

 Stage roles (US and UK) 
 The Miracle (west coast production, 1926)
 The Farewell Supper (After on anatol), 1929
 Silent Witness (1931)
 Grand Hotel (1932)
 Twentieth Century (1932)
 The Cat and the Fiddle (west coast, 1932)
 $25 an Hour (Germaine Granville, 1933)
 Murder at the Vanities (Broadway Production, 1933) Mahogany Hill, Broadway, 1934)
 Going Place (London debut, 1936)
 Idiot's Delight (US tour), 1936
 Twentieth Century (US Tour revival, 1937)
 Claudia 1941–1943, US tour
 The Cat and the Fiddle (revival, New Jersey), 1945
 Louisiana Lady (summer stock, East Coast production, mid 1947)
 A Copy of Madame Aupic'' (East Coast, New Milford, summer stock, 1947)

References

External links 

Olga Baclanova at Virtual History

1893 births
1974 deaths
Actresses from Moscow
Actresses from the Russian Empire
Soviet film actresses
Soviet silent film actresses
Soviet stage actresses
Soviet emigrants to the United States
Deaths from lung cancer in Switzerland